Podalia angulata is a moth of the family Megalopygidae. It was described by Walter Hopp in 1922. It is found in Ecuador.

References

Moths described in 1922
Megalopygidae